Sarangkheda is a village in Shahada taluka in Nandurbar district of ( satpuda ) Maharashtra state in India. Sarangkheda village is situated around 15 km South of Shahada on the bank of Tapti River.

Overview 
Sarangkheda village and towns like Shahada, Nizar, Rajpipla, Taloda, Akkalkuwa, and Dhadgaon in the northern area of Sarangkheda ( satpuda pardesh ) were almost cut off from the rest of Maharashtra until 1957.

This Datta Mandir and Rawal Riyasat is almost 200 years old and renovated around 40 years ago. It is believed that the idol of Datta has been brought from Patan in Patan district.

Each year on the occasion of Datta Jayanti, an annual fair is held for around two weeks and main attractions of the fair is the horse bazaar or horse trading.

Recently a barrage is built just to the east of the bridge to supply water for irrigation and drinking.

The village hosts a Horse trading fair every year in December called 'Sarangkheda Chetak Festival'. This tradition has been going on since recorded in history over 300 years ago.  Maharashtra Tourism Development corporation (MTDC)  has planned to develop a horse museum for travelers that will inform them about the numerous qualities of breed, marking, lifespan and color etc. of horses. The Government has sanctioned Rs 4.98 crores for the museum and the dome-shaped horse museum will be constructed on 6.5 acres land along the Tapti River. The other amenities like art gallery, exhibition venue, audio-visual room, food stall, shops will be made in the museum.

References 

Villages in Nandurbar district